Poka is a village in Saaremaa Parish, Saare County in western Estonia. It is about 103 miles (166 km) south-west of Tallinn, the country’s capital city.

Before the administrative reform in 2017, the village was in Leisi Parish.

References

Villages in Saare County